Dario Antiseri (born 1940 in Foligno) is a Philosophy professor. He holds a bachelor's degree (summa cum laude) in Philosophy from the University of Perugia and for many years he has been Full Professor of Methodology of the Social Sciences at LUISS, in Rome. He taught in Siena, Padova and Rome, where he was also the Dean of the Faculty of Political Science. He retired from academia in 2010. He is an important scholar of Karl R. Popper and Hans-Georg Gadamer, and in many works he tries to show the links between fallibilism and hermeneutics. In 1996, he published a book about Gianni Vattimo's weak thought. With the Italian philosopher Giovanni Reale, he is also author of an important treatise of philosophy in three volumes, which is the most widely used philosophy textbook in Italian schools.

Selected publications
G. Reale - D. Antiseri, Il pensiero occidentale dalle origini ad oggi (La Scuola: Brescia, 1980; 45th ed. 2004). This work has been translated into Spanish, Portuguese and Russian.

References

External links
 

Living people
1940 births
20th-century Italian philosophers
21st-century Italian philosophers
Philosophers of science
University of Perugia alumni
Academic staff of the Libera Università Internazionale degli Studi Sociali Guido Carli